This is a list of members of the Western Australian Legislative Council from October 1870 to June 1872. The chamber had 18 members, as specified by the Legislative Council Act 1870 (33 Vict, No. 13). Section 1 of this Act specified that a minimum of one-third of the Council would be appointed by the Crown. Three of these were official nominees who were part of the Continuous Ministry—namely the Colonial Secretary, Attorney-General and the Surveyor-General—while the remaining three were "non-official nominees".

Of the 12 elected representatives, two members each represented Perth and Fremantle, while the remainder represented the rural districts. Franchise was limited to free men who owned £100 of freehold property or paid £10 per annum rent. An amendment proclaimed on 17 August 1871 allowed former prisoners who had been granted a conditional pardon and who met the above conditions to vote.

Notes
  On 4 May 1871, John McKail, the member for Albany, resigned. At the close of nominations on 23 May for the resulting by-election, Albert Young Hassell was returned unopposed.

Sources
 

Members of Western Australian parliaments by term